Cinderella's Twin is a lost 1920 silent film comedy directed by Dallas M. Fitzgerald and starring Viola Dana. It was produced and distributed by Metro Pictures to poor audience reception.

Cast
Viola Dana as Connie McGill
Wallace MacDonald as Prentice Blue
Ruth Stonehouse as The Lady
Cecil Foster as Helen Flint
Edward Connelly as Pa Du Geen
Victory Bateman as Ma Du Geen
Gertrude Short as Marcia Valentine
Irene Hunt as Gwendolyn Valentine
Edward Cecil as Williams
Calvert Carter as Boggs, a Butler

References

External links

1920 films
American silent feature films
Lost American films
Metro Pictures films
American black-and-white films
1920 comedy films
Silent American comedy films
Films directed by Dallas M. Fitzgerald
1920 lost films
Lost comedy films
1920s American films